Events from the year 2015 in North Korea. The year marks the 70th anniversary of the founding of the Workers' Party of Korea. The year was celebrated as the year of DPRK-Russia friendship.

Incumbents
Premier: Pak Pong-ju
Supreme Leader: Kim Jong-un

Events

January 
 January 2 – The United States enacts financial sanctions on the North Korean Special Operation Force and 10 government officials in retaliation for the Sony Pictures Entertainment hack.

February 
 February 7 – North Korea test fires a new "ultra-precision" intelligent anti-ship missile which is to be deployed across its navy.

March 
 March 2 – North Korea lifts restrictions on entry into the country imposed ostensibly to stop the spread of the Ebola virus.
 March 9 - A North Korean diplomat is caught smuggling $1.7M of gold bars into Bangladesh.

August 
 August 15 – North Korea adopts UTC+08.30, or Pyongyang Standard Time to "eliminate Western imperialism". The time was previously used by both Koreas until the enactment of UTC+09.00 in 1961.

Elections 
 2015 North Korean local elections

Deaths

December
 December 29 – Kim Yang-gon, politician and a senior official of the ruling Workers' Party of Korea. (b. 1942)

References

Further reading

External links

"2015, Year of Great Victory" at Naenara
"DPRK Sportspersons Win about 250 Medals in 2015 Int'l Games" at Naenara
"North Korea's Official 2015 Calendar Revealed" at Daily NK

 
North Korea
Years of the 21st century in North Korea
2010s in North Korea
North Korea